Tuberastyochus tenebrosus is a species of beetle in the family Cerambycidae, the only species in the genus Tuberastyochus.

References

Acanthocinini